Shamsabad (also Romanized as Shamsābād) is a village in Amiriyeh Rural District, in the Central District of Arak County, Markazi Province, Iran. At the 2006 census, its population was 366, in 80 families.

References 

Populated places in Arak County